Corey Weyer (born 28 March 1996) is an Australian field hockey player who plays as a defender for the Australian national team.

Career

Junior National Teams
Weyer has represented Australia at junior level in both Under 18 and Under 21 age groups.

In 2014, Weyer was a member of the Australia Under 18 side at the 2014 Youth Olympic Games in Nanjing, China. The team won the gold medal, defeating Canada 3–2 in a penalty shoot-out following a 3–3 draw.

Weyer made his debut for the Australian Under 21 side, 'The Burras', at the 2016 edition of the Sultan of Johor Cup, winning a gold medal.

In 2016, Weyer also a member of the team at the Junior World Cup in Lucknow, India, where the team finished fourth.

Senior National Team
In 2017, Weyer made his senior international debut for the Kookaburras at the 2017 International Festival of Hockey.

In November 2018, Weyer was named in the squad for the Hockey World Cup in Bhubaneswar, India.

References

External links
 
 
 

1996 births
Living people
Australian male field hockey players
Male field hockey defenders
Field hockey players at the 2014 Summer Youth Olympics
2018 Men's Hockey World Cup players
Youth Olympic gold medalists for Australia